

Events
January 22 – Thomas Tallis and William Byrd are granted a 25-year monopoly for printing and selling part-music and manuscript paper by Queen Elizabeth I of England.
The first performance of a mixed consort takes place in the court of Queen Elizabeth I of England.
First appearance of the dulcian in Nuremberg.
Tomás Luis de Victoria is ordained a priest.

Publications 
Elias Nicolaus Ammerbach – Ein new künstlich Tabulaturbuch (Leipzig: Johann Beyer for Dietrich Gerlach), a book of 40 motet intabulations and one praeambulum by various composers.
Jean d'Arras publishes a chanson.
Giammateo Asola –  for four voices (Venice: sons of Antonio Gardano)
Vincenzo Bellavere – Second book of madrigals for five voices (Venice: heirs of Girolamo Scotto)
Joachim a Burck –  for four voices (Erfurt: Georg Baumann)
William Byrd & Thomas Tallis – Cantiones Sacrae
Ippolito Chamaterò – Magnificats for 8, 9, and 12 voices (Venice: heirs of Girolamo Scotto)
Giovanni Dragoni
First book of madrigals for five voices (Venice: heirs of Girolamo Scotto)
Second book of madrigals for five voices (Venice: heirs of Girolamo Scotto)
Placido Falconio –  for five voices (Venice: Antonio Gardano, sons), including the first appearance of basso seguente
Andrea Gabrieli – First book of madrigals for three voices (Venice: Antonio Gardano, figliuoli)
Jacobus de Kerle – Motets for five and six voices (Munich: Adam Berg), also includes hymns
Orlande de Lassus
, Part 4 (Munich: Adam Berg), a collection of sacred music for four and five voices
Motets for three voices (Munich: Adam Berg)
Philippe de Monte
Fourth book of motets for five voices (Venice: sons of Antonio Gardano)
Sixth book of madrigals for five voices (Venice: Angelo Gardano)
 for five, six, and seven voices (Leuven: Pierre Phalèse & Antwerp: Jean Bellère)
Giovanni Domenico da Nola – Motets for six voices
Antonio Pace – First and second book of madrigals for six voices published in Venice by Giuseppe Guglielmo
Giovanni Pierluigi da Palestrina – Motettorum liber tertius (Third Book of Motets)
Costanzo Porta –  for eight voices (Venice: Giorgio Angelieri)
Antonio Scandello – Newe schöne ausserlesene geistliche deudsche Lieder, published in Dresden.
Il secondo libro de madrigali a cinque voci de floridi virtuosi del Serenissimo Ducca di Baviera, an anthology of music by court composers from Munich, is published.
Kurtzer Ausszug der Christlichen und Catholischen Geseng, a defense of conservative music during the Reformation, is published.

Births 
December 18 – Michelagnolo Galilei, lutenist and composer (died 1631)
date unknown
John Bennet, English composer
Estêvão de Brito, Portuguese composer
Christoph Strauss, cantor, organist and composer (died 1631)
probable
Vittoria Aleotti, Italian composer (died c.1620)
Alfonso Ferrabosco the younger, viol player and composer (died 1628)
Ennemond Gaultier, French lutenist and composer (died 1651)
Giovanni Priuli, composer (died 1626)
Giovanni Maria Trabaci, composer (died 1647)

Deaths 
March 15 – Annibale Padovano, Venetian organist and composer (born 1527)
April 17 – Johann Bertram, German composer, kantor, and theologian
July 14 – Richard Taverner, writer, translator, politician and composer of church music (born 1505)
August 16 – Francesco Adriani, Italian composer
probable – Giacomo Gorzanis, Italian lutenist
possible (alternatively 1576) – Nicola Vicentino, Italian music theorist and composer (born 1511)

References

 
Music
16th century in music
Music by year